The New Zealand women's national football team has represented New Zealand at the FIFA Women's World Cup on six occasions in 1991, 2007, 2011, 2015, 2019 and 2023. They have never won a game or advanced beyond the group stage.

1991 World cup
For the World Cup in the People's Republic of China, the New Zealanders were able to qualify. The 1991 OFC Women's Championship qualifying tournament ranked # 1 Australia and Papua New Guinea. New Zealand and Australia were tied, but New Zealand had scored more goals against Papua New Guinea. Both had won against each other once with 1-0. New Zealand drove to the World Cup as Oceania champion, Australia had to watch.

In China, New Zealand was assigned to the group with the hosts. Other opponents were Denmark, against which the first World Cup match was denied on 17 November 1991 in Guangzhou and lost 3-0, as well as Norway, which was lost 4-0 in the second game. Against host China then Kim Nye scored the first World Cup goal for New Zealand at 1: 4. As a last seed New Zealand dropped out without a point win.

Group A

1995 World Cup
Four years later, Australia was able to turn the tables. At 1994 OFC Women's Championship they scored more goals against Papua New Guinea, with Australia and New Zealand playing 1-0 and 1-1, respectively. With this New Zealand had to watch this time and thus missed the qualification for the first women's football tournament at the 1996 Olympic Games, since only the eight best teams of the World Cup could qualify for it.

1999 World Cup 
For the third World Cup, six oceanic teams had already applied, so that at the 1998 OFC Women's Championship, which served as a qualification was initially played in two triplets against each other. The New Zealanders succeeded in the first game against Samoa with 21: 0 the highest victory in their international history. The second game was then beating a 14-0 Fiji and reaching the semi-finals. Here Papua New Guinea 5: 0 was defeated, so that it came to the final against Australia. This lost New Zealand with 1: 3 and thus did not qualify again for the World Cup.

2003 World Cup 
Actually, the 2003 World Cup should take place again in the People's Republic of China. Due to the SARS epidemic, the tournament was temporarily relocated to the United States. Thus the World Cup took place for the second time in the USA. As only five teams from Oceania had registered for 2003 OFC Women's Championship, the championship was held in a group in each against each other mode. New Zealand won the first three games against Samoa (14-0), Cook Islands (9-0) and Papua New Guinea (5-0) and met Australia in the final game also won three times against the other three. With 0: 2 New Zealand lost to Australia and did not go to the World Cup again in the US.

2007 World Cup 
Four years later, the World Cup took place for the second time in the People's Republic of China, which meant that China did not have to qualify. Australia was - in particular to the men's team better chances to qualify for a World Cup - to switch to the Asian Association. From then on, New Zealand did not have any serious opponents in the OFC Women's Nations Cup. In the 2007 OFC Women's Championship, they qualified easily with three wins against Tonga (6: 1), Samoa (8: 0) and Papua New Guinea (7: 0 ), which in principle was only about which New Zealander was the top scorer. In the end, the crown Kirsty Yallop and Nicola Smith shared four goals each.

New Zealand then joined the World Cup with English coach John Herdman. The finals saw New Zealand as well as the first participation in the group with hosts China and Denmark. Added to this was Brazil. New Zealand lost first against Brazil with 0: 5, then against Denmark and China each with 0: 2 and drove back as a group last, but this time without scoring home.

Group D

2011 World Cup
For the World Cup in Germany, New Zealand took part in the 2010 OFC Women's Championship in the eight teams qualify. In the championship, which took place in New Zealand, New Zealand could defeat in the group stage first Vanuatu 14-0, the Cook Islands 10-0 and Tahiti 7-0. As a group winners, the Solomon Islands was defeated 8-0 in the semi-final and defeated Papua New Guinea 11-0 in the final.

In the final round in Germany New Zealand met in the first game on Japan and lost to the eventual champion only with 1: 2. Against England succeeded in the second game even for the first time in a World Cup game to take the lead. In the end, however, this game was lost 1: 2. After all, the New Zealanders had already scored twice as many goals as in the first participation. Against Mexico succeeded then even after 0: 2 deficit the first point profit. The two goals fell but only in the 90th minute and the fourth minute of stoppage time. This ended a series of 8 defeats. As Mexico had won a point against England, New Zealand was again just group bottom.

Group B

2015 World Cup 
In the Qualification for the World Cup in Canada, for which the Oceanic teams continued to be only allowed one starting position after the increase in the number of participants, New Zealand took part in the 2014 OFC Women's Nations Cup again as the winner. Since only a total of four teams participated, only three games had to be played. All were conceded without conceding: 16: 0 against Tonga, 3: 0 against Papua New Guinea and 11: 0 against the Cook Islands. Best scorer was again Amber Hearn with seven goals.

New Zealand was not placed in the group draw and was assigned to Group A with host Canada.  The Canadians have since been coached by former New Zealander coach John Herdman. Other opponents were for the third time China as well as the World Cup newcomer Netherlands.
Due to two blatant mistakes (penalties against the Netherlands did not get, as well as a false penalty - Hasset got the ball in the face, not to the hand) retired as the playfully second strongest team of the group undeserved again as a group last.

Hannah Wilkinson scored two World Cups in the final group game as the first New Zealand footballer (women and men).

Group A

2019 World Cup
In the Qualification for the third World Cup in Europe, for which the Oceanic teams were still only allowed one starting position, New Zealand played for the Football from mid-November to early December 2018. Oceanic Championships, which entitles to the World Cup participation. Shortly before the tournament, the Scot Tom Sermanni became the new New Zealand national coach. Although record-breaking goal-scorer Amber Hearn could not be used for injury, New Zealand won all matches significantly (11-0 against Tonga, 6-0 against the Cook Islands and 10-0 against Fiji in the group stage, respectively 8-0 in the semi-final against New Caledonia) and finals against Fiji) and secured the title of Oceania Champion for the sixth time. In the third group match, Ria Percival replaced Abby Erceg with her 133rd international match as a record national player. With Sarah Gregorius New Zealand provided one of the top two goal-scorers in the tournament (8 goals), 6 goals contributed Emma Rolston for which these were the first international goals for the senior team. 5 goals scored Betsy Hassett, Annalie Longo and Rosie White. Grace Jale (2), who had her first international appearance at the tournament as well as the third goalkeeper Nadia Olla, as well as Sarah Morton (1), Katie Rood (3 ), Paige Satchell (1) their first international goals.

The New Zealanders met Canada and the Netherlands at the World Cup as well as for the first time in a World Cup match Cameroon. After losing to Canada and the Netherlands, New Zealand and Cameroon still had the chance to reach the last sixteen by winning in the last game.  In the 57th minute, Ajara Nchout scored the first goal for the Africans. In the 80th minute then Aurelle Awona drew a shot into the own goal. Since a draw did not benefit both teams, they tried to score the winner. In the fifth minute then Nchout could open the door to the second round for Cameroon with their second goal. New Zealand was eliminated for the fifth time in the first round and this time was the only team whose players could not score, as the only goal for New Zealand was an own goal.

Group E

2023 World Cup
New Zealand will co-host the 2023 FIFA Women's World Cup alongside Australia, the Football Ferns automatically qualified as co-host.

FIFA World Cup record

Record

Record by opponent

Goalscorers

 Own goals scored for opponents
 Terry McCahill (scored for Norway in 1991)

Notes

References

 
World Cup
Countries at the FIFA Women's World Cup